Surface pressure may refer to:

 "Surface Pressure", a song from the film Encanto (2021)
 Surface pressure in physical chemistry
 Surface pressure within the Earth's atmosphere